Frank Thomas Shutt, CBE (15 September 1859 - 5 January 1940) was a Canadian agricultural chemist who worked as Dominion Chemist at the Dominion Experimental Farms in Ottawa.

Shutt was born in Stoke Newington, London to William Denis Shutt and Charlotte Cawthorne. The family moved to Canada and Shutt studied at the University of Toronto receiving a BA in 1885 and a MA in 1886. He worked as chemist at the Dominion Experimental Farms from 1887 and was given the title of Dominion Chemist from 1912. He worked on problems of plant nutrition until his retirement in 1933. He visited other agricultural research stations in Europe and England and was acquainted with John Bennet Laws, Joseph Henry Gilbert, Daniel Hall and John Russell. He received an honorary D.Sc. in 1914 from the University of Toronto.

He was appointed Commander of the Most Excellent Order of the British Empire in 1935 and in the same year received the Sir Joseph Flavelle medal.

References

Canadian chemists
1859 births
1940 deaths
Canadian Commanders of the Order of the British Empire